A hybrid lovebird is the result of two species of lovebirds being cross-bred. Hybrids produced by the pairing of a rosy-faced lovebird (or peach-faced lovebird) with one of the "eye-ring" species (i.e. those species which have a prominent area of white bare skin encircling the eye, Fischer's lovebird being a typical example) are usually sterile, whereas crosses between the "eye-ring" species are often fertile.

Behaviors 
Primitive species pairing takes places when the birds are about four months old. Prior to that they are completely dependent of their parents even though they have already developed adult plumage. In some species, pairing takes place even sooner, around two months of age and at that time they still have their juvenile plumage. It usually takes no more than a few hours to determine if lovebirds are lifelong partners or not. When birds reach their sexual maturity, their behaviors become more elaborate. One common behavior amongst female species is their active aggression to the male species when he is trying to woo her. The male's response is a combination of fear, sexual appetite, aggression and frustration. Using hear and sexual appetite as his primary motivation, the male first approaches his mate by sliding toward and then moving away from her all while turning around his perch. This is common to all species, and is called “switch-sliding”. More behaviors associated with frustration from the male species include squeak twittering. This is common between three species- the Madagascar lovebird, the Abyssinian lovebird, and the red-faced lovebird. “Squeak-twittering” is when the male lets out a series of high-pitched sounds when the female stops him and disappears into the nest. These sounds can vary in pitch and purity of tone and also have no recognizable rhythm. In species such like the peach-faced and all four types of white-eye-ringed forms, their squeak twittering is different. There is less variability in pitch and purity but there is also a distinct rhythm. Another behavior is head scratching. It usually occurs out of frustration and usually involves the foot that is closest to the female at the time.

Courtship feeding 
This is the transfer of regurgitated food from one partner is the pair to the other. In most species it is the female transferring food to her male partner. But in species such as the peach-faced and white-eye-ringed, it is the male's responsibility.

Copulation 
Females indicate when they are ready to copulate. She adjusts the feathers of her head. The more she fluffs up her feathers, the more readily she is which encourages the male even more. When finally ready, she will lean forward and raise her head and tail. This gesture is not common for all species, especially in primitive species. It is a recent evolution for female bird species. When birds first pair together, they are awkward. The male makes many mistakes, which make the female threaten and thwart towards their mate. After time, the male learns and causes the female less aggravation.

Disagreements 
Disagreements between members of the same species are handled differently than nesting pairs. There are elaborate patterns of threats and appeasement. Some examples include a series of long, rapid strides toward opponent, which suggests aggression. Ruffling of feathers indicates fear and the will to escape. Submission can be shown by fleeing, being quiet, turning its head away from their opponent or fluffing its plumage. Because of these codes used between birds, this results in little to no actual fights happening. Although, when they do occur, the birds literally tear each other apart. Display fighting is common amongst recently evolved species. This fake fighting primarily consists of bill fencing, which consists of the birds parrying and thrusting their bills and aiming sharp nips at their opponents’ toes.

References
Dilger, William C. “The Behavior of Lovebirds.” Scientific American, vol. 206, no. 1, 1962, pp. 88–99., www.jstor.org/stable/24937198.

Lovebirds
Lovebird
Aviculture